The Gitschberg is a mountain of the Zillertal Alps in South Tyrol, Italy.

References 
 Homepage Gitschberg

External links 

Mountains of the Alps
Mountains of South Tyrol
Zillertal Alps